William John McCoy (September 30, 1834June 28, 1897) was an American farmer, Democratic politician, and Wisconsin pioneer.  He served six years in the Wisconsin State Assembly, representing Grant County.

Biography
McCoy was born on September 30, 1834, in Argyle, New York. He moved to Beetown, Wisconsin, in 1852 and to Lancaster, Wisconsin, in 1880. McCoy died on June 28, 1897.

Career
McCoy was elected to the Assembly in 1875 and served four terms. Additionally, he was Chairman of the Beetown Board for five years between 1869 and 1876. He was a Democrat.

Electoral history

Wisconsin Assembly (1875)

| colspan="6" style="text-align:center;background-color: #e9e9e9;"| General Election, November 2, 1875

Wisconsin Assembly (1877)

| colspan="6" style="text-align:center;background-color: #e9e9e9;"| General Election, November 6, 1877

Wisconsin Assembly (1882, 1884, 1886)

| colspan="6" style="text-align:center;background-color: #e9e9e9;"| General Election, November 7, 1882

| colspan="6" style="text-align:center;background-color: #e9e9e9;"| General Election, November 4, 1884

| colspan="6" style="text-align:center;background-color: #e9e9e9;"| General Election, November 2, 1886

References

External links

RootsWeb

|-

People from Argyle, New York
People from Lancaster, Wisconsin
Mayors of places in Wisconsin
Democratic Party members of the Wisconsin State Assembly
1834 births
1897 deaths
19th-century American politicians
People from Beetown, Wisconsin